The Austrian Paralympic Committee (OPC) was founded in 1998. Since April 2009 the former Austrian Minister of Health, Youth and Family and former NPC Vice President Maria Rauch-Kallat was elected as President. One of her main goals is to support youth and women with disabilities. Petra Huber takes over the responsibility of Secretary General, the two Vice-Presidents are Hermann Krist and Brigitte Jank.

The Austrian Paralympic Committee has its headquarters in Vienna.

Tasks of the Austrian Paralympic Committee 
The main task of the Austrian Paralympic Committee is to enable qualified athletes with physical disabilities, visual impairment and mental impairment to compete at the Paralympics. The Austrian Paralympic Committee supports by raising financial resources for sending the athletes to the Paralympics and coordinates and prepares the participation in cooperation with the sports federations.

One important goal of the Austrian Paralympic Committee is to increase the interest and the attention of the public and the media at the Paralympic Games.

In addition, the Austrian Paralympic Committee represents Austrian interests at conferences and meetings of the International Paralympic Committee and the European Paralympic Committee.

So far, the athletes from Austria won 214 gold, 232 silver and 232 bronze medals at Paralympic Games (353 at the Summer Paralympics and 325 at the Winter Paralympics). The most successful female Austrian athlete at the Paralympics was Rosa Schweizer with 23 medals (including 16 gold medals), the most successful male Austrian athlete was Engelbert Rangger with a total of 12 medals.

See also
Austria at the Paralympics

References

External links 
Official website

National Paralympic Committees
Paralympic
Austria at the Paralympics
Sports organizations established in 1998
1998 establishments in Austria
Disability organisations based in Austria